Randy Allen may refer to:

Randy Allen (basketball) (born 1965), American basketball player
Randy Allen (American football) (born 1950), former American football player and current high school football coach

See also
Allen (surname)